Port is a surname. Notable people with the surname include:

Annabel Port (born 1975), English radio personality
Bernard Port, English footballer
Chal Port (1931–2011), American college baseball coach
Chris Port (born 1967), American football player
Jaan Port (1891–1950), Estonian biologist
Mart Port (1922–2012), Estonian architect
Mike Port (born 1945), American baseball executive
Sidney Port (1911–2007), American lawyer, business executive, and philanthropist
Stephen Port (born 1975), English serial killer
Whitney Port (born 1985), American television personality

See also
James F. Ports, Jr. (born 1958), American politician